The Instituto Autónomo de Bibliotecas e Información del Estado Mérida or IBIME (Spanish for Autonomous Institute of Libraries and Information of the State Mérida) is a regional agency of the Mérida government in Venezuela, which takes care of their network of libraries, thus encouraging activities in favour of the cultural, historical and educational heritage of the communities in Mérida.

History
The Autonomous Institute of Library and Information Services (IBIME) was created on 18 June 1998 as published on the 90th Special Official State Gazette of Mérida, in which the Legislature of the State of Mérida would decree the Law of the Autonomous Institute of Libraries and Information of the State Mérida.

Purposes
Being responsible for the implementation of policies regarding library and information services offered to the merideño community following the technical library-regulations (these are itself ruled by the National System of Public Libraries and the policies of the National Library as a governing body in Venezuela).
Guaranteeing the principles of liberty when selecting bibliographic and no bibliographic materials in different formats that comprise the regional and national historical heritage.
Acting as a state government entity responsible for enforcing policies, regulations and procedures which, regarding library services, are offered to the merideño community without distinction of nationally, creed, race, sex, education level or social status.

Bibliomóvil
Bookmobile or mobile library is a mobile service that loans books from different categories, which aims to serve the communities, institutions, community councils, culture committees and sports groups who request the service and support reading and cultural activities.

External links 
IBIME homepage 

Libraries in Venezuela
Organizations established in 1998
Mérida (state)
1998 establishments in Venezuela